The Bodhisattva Precepts (Skt. bodhisattva-śīla) are a set of ethical trainings (śīla) used in Mahāyāna Buddhism to advance a practitioner along the path to becoming a bodhisattva. Traditionally, monastics observed the basic moral code in Buddhism, the prātimokṣa (such as that of the Dharmaguptaka), but in the Mahāyāna tradition, monks may observe the Bodhisattva Precepts as well. The Bodhisattva Precepts are associated with the bodhisattva vow to save all beings and with bodhicitta.

Sets of Precepts

Brahmajāla Sūtra 
The Brahmajāla Sūtra, translated by Kumārajīva (c. 400 CE), has a list of ten major and forty-eight minor Bodhisattva vows. The Bodhisattva Precepts may be often called the "Brahma Net Precepts", particularly in Buddhist scholarship, although other sets of bodhisattva precepts may be found in other texts as well. Typically, in East Asian Mahāyāna traditions, only the ten major precepts are considered the bodhisattva precepts. According to the sutra, the ten major bodhisattva precepts are in summary:

 Not to kill or encourage others to kill.
 Not to steal or encourage others to steal.
 Not to engage in licentious acts or encourage others to do so. A monk is expected to abstain from sexual conduct entirely.
 Not to use false words and speech, or encourage others to do so.
 Not to trade or sell alcoholic beverages or encourage others to do so.
 Not to broadcast the misdeeds or faults of the Buddhist assembly, nor encourage others to do so.
 Not to praise oneself and speak ill of others, or encourage others to do so.
 Not to be stingy, or encourage others to do so.
 Not to harbor anger or encourage others to be angry.
 Not to speak ill of the Buddha, the Dharma or the Sangha (lit. the Triple Jewel) or encourage others to do so.

Breaking any of these precepts is described as a major offense in the sutra. A fuller description is as follows:

Indo-Tibetan Buddhism
In Tibetan Buddhism there are two lineages of bodhisattva precepts, one from Asanga's tradition and another from Shantideva. Asanga (circa 300 CE) delineated 18 major vows and forty-six minor vows in the "Bodhisattvabhumi" section of the Yogācārabhūmi Śāstra. According to Alexander Berzin, the bodhisattva vows transmitted by the 10th-century Indian master Atisha "derives from the Sutra of Akashagarbha (Nam-mkha'i snying-po mdo, Skt. Akashagarbhasutra), as cited in Śikṣāsamuccaya (“Training Anthology”, Tib. bSlabs-btus), compiled in India by Śāntideva in the 8th century" including 18 primary and 48 secondary downfalls.

These Bodhisattva vows are still used in all four major traditions of Tibetan Buddhism. The eighteen major vows (as actions to be abandoned) which are shared by both traditions are as follows:
 Praising oneself or belittling others due to attachment to receiving material offerings, praise and respect.
 Not giving material aid or (due to miserliness) not teaching the Dharma to those who are suffering and without a protector.
 Not listening to others' apologies or striking others.
 Abandoning the Mahayana by saying that Mahayana texts are not the words of Buddha or teaching what appears to be the Dharma but is not. 
 Taking things belonging to the Buddha, Dharma or Sangha.
 Abandoning the holy Dharma by saying that texts which teach the three vehicles are not the Buddha's word.
 With anger depriving ordained ones of their robes, beating and imprisoning them or causing them to lose their ordination even if they have impure morality, for example, by saying that being ordained is useless.
 Committing any of the five extremely negative actions: (1) killing one's mother, (2) killing one's father, (3) killing an arhat, (4) intentionally drawing blood from a Buddha or (5) causing schism in the Sangha community by supporting and spreading sectarian views.
 Holding distorted views (which are contrary to the teaching of Buddha, such as denying the existence of the Three Jewels or the law of cause and effect etc.)
 Destroying towns, villages, cities or large areas by means such as fire, bombs, pollution or black magic.
 Teaching emptiness to those whose minds are unprepared.
 Causing those who have entered the Mahayana to turn away from working for the full enlightenment of Buddhahood and encouraging them to work merely for their own liberation from suffering.
 Causing others to abandon their Prātimokṣa vows.
 Belittling the Śrāvakayāna or Pratyekabuddhayāna (by holding and causing others to hold the view that these vehicles do not abandon attachment and other delusions).
 Falsely stating that oneself has realised profound emptiness and that if others meditate as one has, they will realize emptiness and become as great and as highly realized as oneself.
 Taking gifts from others who were encouraged to give you things originally intended as offerings to the Three Jewels. Not giving things to the Three Jewels that others have given you to give to them, or accepting property stolen from the Three Jewels.
 Causing those engaged in calm-abiding meditation to give it up by giving their belongings to those who are merely reciting texts or making bad disciplinary rules which cause a spiritual community not to be harmonious.
 Abandoning either of the two types of bodhicitta (aspiring and engaging).

According to Atiśa, the Prātimokṣa vows are the basis for the Bodhisattva vows. Without keeping one of the different sets of Prātimokṣa vows (in one of the existing Vinaya schools), there can be no Bodhisattva vow.

The Sixteen Bodhisattva Precepts in Sōtō Zen

In the Sōtō school of Zen, the founder Dōgen established a somewhat expanded version of the Bodhisattva Precepts for use by both priests and lay followers, based on both Brahma Net Sutra and other sources.  Many various translations exist, the following is used by John Daido Loori, Roshi, founder of Zen Mountain Monastery:

The Three Treasures 
Taking refuge in the Buddha
Taking refuge in the Dharma
Taking refuge in the Sangha

The Three Treasures are universally known in Buddhism as the Three Refuges or Three Jewels.

The Three Pure Precepts 
Do not create Evil
Practice Good
Actualize Good For Others

These are also known as the Three Root Precepts, and are mentioned in the Brahmajāla Sūtra as well.

The Ten Grave Precepts 
Respect life – Do not kill
Be giving – Do not steal
Honor the body – Do not misuse sexuality
Manifest truth – Do not lie
Proceed clearly – Do not cloud the mind
See the perfection – Do not speak of others' errors and faults
Realize self and others as one – Do not elevate the self and blame others
Give generously – Do not be withholding
Actualize harmony – Do not be angry
Experience the intimacy of things – Do not defile the Three Treasures

Traditional uses

Chinese, Korean, and Vietnamese traditions
The Chinese Chan monk, Yin Shun, wrote of the Bodhisattva Precepts, "To cultivate bodhi mind means to accept the bodhisattva precepts and practice the ten good deeds."

In practice, the acceptance of and ordination of the Bodhisattva Precepts varies greatly depending on the school of Mahayana Buddhism. In East Asian Buddhism, a fully ordained monk or nun ordains under the traditional prātimokṣa precepts first according to the vinaya of the Dharmaguptaka. In the Chinese tradition, this is called the Four Part Vinaya. Then as a supplement, the same disciple would undertake the Bodhisattva Precepts as well.

Monks and nuns are not considered "ordained" by the Bodhisattva Precepts, but rather by the "Four Part Vinaya", while the Bodhisattva Precepts served to strengthen the Mahayana ideals. Similarly, the Bodhisattva Precepts are given to lay disciples to strengthen their devotion to Buddhism as well. Such disciples often take the basic Five Precepts and then the Bodhisattva precepts as a supplement.

Japanese traditions
In Buddhism in Japan, the "Four-Part Vinaya" was deemphasized with the rise of Saichō and the Tendai sect and a new monastic community was set up exclusively using the Brahmajala Sutras Bodhisattva Precepts. All Vinaya ordinations at the time were given at Tōdai-ji in Nara and Saichō had wanted to both undermine the power of the Nara Buddhist community and to establish a "purely Mahayana lineage", and made a request to the Emperor to Later Buddhist sects, which was granted 7 days after his death in 822.

Later Buddhist sects in Japan, including the Sōtō school of Zen, Jōdo-shū and Shingon Buddhism, adopted a similar approach to their monastic communities and exclusive use of the Bodhisattva Precepts. By this time in Japan, the Vinaya lineage had all but died out and Japan's remote location made it difficult to reestablish though limited efforts by Jōkei and the Shingon Risshu revived it for a time.

References

Further reading

 Muller, Charles, Tanaka, Kenneth, K. (2017). The Brahma´s Net Sutra, Berkeley: Numata Center for Buddhist Translation and Research
 Chappell, David W. (1996).  Searching for a Mahāyāna Social Ethic, The Journal of Religious Ethics 24 (2), 351-375

External links
 Dogen, On Receiving the Precepts
 The Bodhisattva Precepts for Laypeople

Zen Buddhist philosophical concepts
Buddhist oaths
Buddhist ethics
Bodhisattvas